Dinaphthylene dioxide, also known as peri-xanthenoxanthene (PXX), is an organic compound used to synthesize 3,9-diphenyl-peri-xanthenoxanthene (Ph-PXX). Ph-PXX, in its soluble form, is used as organic semiconductor for thin-film transistors (TFT).

References

Polycyclic aromatic compounds